The 2018 Asian Games, officially known as the XVIII Asiad, is the largest sporting event in Asia governed by Olympic Council of Asia (OCA). It was held at Jakarta and Palembang, Indonesia  between 18 August – 2 September 2018, with 465 events in 40 sports and disciplines featured in the Games. This resulted in 465 medal sets being distributed.

Two bronze medals were awarded in some sports: all events in badminton (7), boxing (10), bridge (6), fencing (12), judo (15), jujitsu (8), kabaddi (2), karate (12), kurash (7), Ssambo (4), sepak takraw (6), soft tennis (5), squash (4), table tennis (5), taekwondo (14), tennis (5) and wrestling (18), most events in pencak silat (10) and some events in wushu (6). Furthermore, there was a third-place tie in athletics men's high jump event, giving a total of 157 additional bronze medals.

As a result, a total of 1,552 medals comprising 465 gold medals, 465 silver medals, and 622 bronze medals were awarded to athletes.

Medal table

NOCs without medal

Changes in medal standings 

On 3 September 2018, it was announced that Pürevdorjiin Orkhon of team Mongolia had tested positive for stanozolol in a urine test conducted on 20 August 2018. Violating the anti-doping rules, Orkhon was stripped of her gold medal.

Due to the positive result of the test for stanozolol, the Athletics Integrity Unit declared to strip from Bahraini athlete Kemi Adekoya all results achieved after 24 August 2018, including her two gold medals in the 400 hurdles and the 4x400 mixed relay at the Asian Games. The medals were re-awarded to athletes of Vietnam and India, respectively.

Kumush Yuldashova of Uzbekistan originally won the gold medal in the 78 kg Kurash, but she was disqualified after testing positive for stanozolol.

  - Wrestling at the 2018 Asian Games – Women's freestyle 62 kg
  - Athletics at the 2018 Asian Games – Women's 400 metres hurdles / Athletics at the 2018 Asian Games – Mixed 4 × 400 metres relay
  - Kurash at the 2018 Asian Games – Women's 78 kg

References

External links
Official medal table

Medal table
2018